Oğuzhan Uğur (born 29 January 1984) is a Turkish musician, director, screenwriter and Internet personality.

Uğur was born in Ankara. He is a graduate of Akdeniz University with a degree in fine arts. While in university, he worked as an assistant for Mustafa Şevki Doğan and Osman Sınav. In 2011, he directed and wrote the script for the movie Ağır Abi. In 2012, his debut album, Çok Şükür, was released. Uğur continued his music career by releasing a number of singles. In 2014, he directed the music video for Murat Dalkılıç's song "Leyla". Together they later voiced a duet, titled "Mağlubiyet".

Since 2017, he has been producing content on various YouTube channels, including "Budabi", "BaBaLa TV" and "Onedio". In 2020, he presented the first season of Exathlon Turkey, which was released on Netflix.

Filmography

Discography

Albums 
Çok Şükür (2012)

Singles 
"Terbiyesizim" (2012)
"Panpa" (2012)
"Birinci Vazife" (2013)
"İstemiyorum" (2013)
"Sağ Salim" (2014)
"Bal Prensesi" (2014)
"Dengi Dengine" (feat. Ege Çubukçu) (2014)
"Biyolojik Unsur" (2015)
"Mağlubiyet" (2016)
"Madım Mı?" (2016)
"Kıskanç" (2016)
"Bana Bunu Yapma" (2017)
"Tarihi Çevir" (2017)

References

External links 

1984 births
Living people
Turkish film directors
Turkish male screenwriters
Turkish YouTubers
Turkish male singers
Akdeniz University alumni